Gagan Mohindra (born 7 April 1978) is a British Conservative Party politician.  He has been the member of Parliament (MP) for South West Hertfordshire since the 2019 general election.

Early life
Mohindra was born into a Punjabi Hindu family in 1978. Mohindra's parents were both from Punjab, India, and immigrated to the United Kingdom before Mohindra was born. His paternal grandfather served in the British Indian Army. Mohindra was raised as a Hindu. 

Mohindra read Mathematics at King's College London and worked in financial services, before founding the Chromex Group four years after graduating, where he worked until 2015. The last filed accounts of the company show liabilities of £1.4 million.

Political career
Mohindra was elected as councillor for the Grange Hill Ward of the Epping Forest District Council in May 2006, and has served as a councillor for the Chigwell and Loughton Broadway division on Essex County Council since 2017. He continued in these roles, unpaid, after being elected to Parliament until 2021. Former MP for Ilford North, Lee Scott, succeeded Mohindra in his council seat. Mohindra was also previously Chairman of Essex Conservatives.

He stood for the Conservative Party candidate in North Tyneside at the 2010 general election and finished third in a traditionally strong Labour seat. He was also shortlisted to become MP for Brentwood and Ongar in 2017, but lost the nomination to Alex Burghart.

Mohindra was chosen as the Conservative candidate for South West Hertfordshire after former Justice Secretary David Gauke lost the whip for voting to block a no-deal Brexit. Mohindra was one of 15 MPs of Indian origin elected at the 2019 general election. He is a member of the Conservative Friends of India, a group within the Conservative Party.

In 2020, Mohindra was appointed to the Public Accounts Committee. 

In October 2020, Mohindra voted against the opposition motion to provide free school meals to children during school holidays. In May 2022, during the cost-of-living crisis, Mohindra voted against a motion that could have helped struggling families by taxing high-earning gas megacorporations.

On 13 June 2022, Mohindra was appointed Parliamentary Private Secretary to Priti Patel, the home secretary.

References

External links

1978 births
Living people
UK MPs 2019–present
Conservative Party (UK) MPs for English constituencies
Members of Parliament for South West Hertfordshire
Members of Essex County Council
British politicians of Indian descent
Conservative Party (UK) councillors
Councillors in Essex